Shkreli may refer to:
 Shkreli (region), region in the Malësia region of Northern Albania
 Shkreli (tribe), Albanian tribe
 Azem Shkreli (1938-1997), Albanian writer and poet
 Lesh Shkreli (born 1957), Albanian-American soccer player
 Martin Shkreli (born 1983), American businessman and convicted felon
 Bernard Lown#Shkreli Awards, presented by the Lown Institute, for "worst examples of profiteering and dysfunction in health care"